Monroe Nash (September 17, 1912 – July 26, 1997) was an American businessman in the kosher food industry.  He and co-inventor Erich G. Freudenstein are credited with US Patent #3,108,882, "Method for Preparing an Edible Fish Product" for the jelly made from fish broth in which commercial gefilte fish varieties are packed. The patent was granted on October 29, 1963.

See also
Gefilte fish
Kashrut
Kosher foods

References

1912 births
1997 deaths
20th-century American businesspeople